James Creaney (born 19 October 1988) is a Scottish footballer and coach who plays as a left-back for Stirling Albion.

Career
Creaney began his footballing career at Kilmarnock's Academy, and signed with Ayr United in 2005. However, he only played for the club in Cup matches, and two years later (after a spell with Troon in the Junior divisions), he signed with Stranraer.

In August 2009, Creaney moved to Ireland, signing with Dundalk. However, after failing to appear in his new club, he joined Galway United in January 2010. He made his debut for the club on 5 March, in a 0–2 away loss against St Patrick's Athletic.

After being released by Galway in 2010 summer, Creaney signed with Second Division side Dumbarton. In his first season, he was a part of the side who achieved promotion to the First Division; he made his division debut on 11 August 2012, in a 1–4 away defeat against Airdrieonians.

On 30 July 2013, Creaney signed with Alloa Athletic, in the Scottish Championship. In April 2014, he revealed that he had been playing for over a year with a heart condition. On 24 July 2014, Creaney signed for Stirling Albion. After one season with Albion, Creaney signed for Scottish Junior side Hurlford United, spending with year with the club.

In July 2016 Creaney returned to senior football, signing for Scottish League Two side Cowdenbeath on a six-month deal, leaving the club in December 2016 when his contract expired. After a short spell with Kilbirnie Ladeside, Creaney signed for Annan Athletic in July 2017.

Creaney signed for Stirling Albion in 2019, and was made caretaker manager in December 2021 following the resignation of Kevin Rutkiewicz, and until the hiring of Darren Young.

References

External links

1988 births
Living people
Footballers from Glasgow
Scottish footballers
Association football defenders
Ayr United F.C. players
Troon F.C. players
Stranraer F.C. players
Dundalk F.C. players
Galway United F.C. (1937–2011) players
Dumbarton F.C. players
Alloa Athletic F.C. players
Stirling Albion F.C. players
Hurlford United F.C. players
Cowdenbeath F.C. players
Kilbirnie Ladeside F.C. players
Annan Athletic F.C. players
Scottish expatriate footballers
Scottish expatriate sportspeople in Ireland
Expatriate association footballers in the Republic of Ireland
Scottish Football League players
Scottish Professional Football League players
Scottish Junior Football Association players
Stirling Albion F.C. managers